Pierre Bazy (28 March 1853 – 22 January 1934) was a French surgeon and urologist born in Sainte-Croix-Volvestre.

He studied medicine in Toulouse, afterwards serving as an interne at the Hôpital Lourcine in Paris. He successively worked at the Bicêtre, Hôpital Tenon and Hôpital Saint-Louis. At the Hôpital Beaujon he was appointed director of urology. Bazy was a member of the Académie de Médecine and the Académie des Sciences (1921).

A specialist in genitourinary medicine, he is credited with coining the term uretéro-cysto-néostomie (today known as ureteroneocystostomy) for surgery involving implantation of the upper end of a transected ureter into the bladder. Bazy was a proponent of preventive serotherapy for treatment of tetanus.

Selected writings 
 Atlas des maladies des voies urinaires, with Félix Guyon (1831–1920).
 De l'uretéro-cysto-néostomie (1894)
 Maladies des voies urinaires (1896–1901); multi-volume.
 Contribution à la chirurgie de l'uretère. De l'uretéro-pyélo-néostomie (1897)
 La Serotherapie dans le tetanos (1914)
 Urologie pratique, (second edition- 1930).

References 
 IDREF.fr (biography and bibliography)

People from Ariège (department)
French surgeons
French urologists
1934 deaths
1853 births